Pinacolborane is the borane with the formula (CH3)4C2O2BH. Often pinacolborane is abbreviated HBpin. It features a boron hydride functional group incorporated in a five-membered C2O2B ring. Like related boron alkoxides, pinacolborane is monomeric. It is a colorless liquid. It features a reactive B-H functional group.

Use in organic synthesis
In the presence of catalysts, pinacolborane hydroborates alkenes and, less rapidly, alkynes.

Pinacolborane also affects catalyst-free hydroboration of aldehydes, ketones, and carboxylic acids.

Pinacolborane is used in borylation, a form of C-H activation.

Dehydrogenation of pinacolborane affords dipinacolatodiborane (B2pin2):
2(CH3)4C2O2BH → (CH3)4C2O2B-BO2C2(CH3)4 + H2

Related compounds
Catecholborane

References

Organoboron compounds
Boranes